Golalare (Sanskrit गोलाराडे, Hindi गोलालारे ) is a Jain community of Bhadawar and Bundelkhand region in India. Their original center is the Bhind-Etawah region on the banks of the Chambal river. Some of them have migrated to Bundelkhand region.

A section of the Golalare are now known as Kharaua. Some of the bhattarakas of Balatkara Gana who had a seat at Ater, and Rura, were born in this same community.

History 
According to some of the inscriptions, the Golalare are descendants of the ancient Ikshvakus.

See also
 Chanderi
 Balatkara Gana
 Jainism in Bundelkhand
 Golapurva

References

Social groups of Madhya Pradesh
Jain communities